Better Capital is a British Private equity firm founded by Jon Moulton in 2009.

Investments

Better Capital has had investments in the following companies:
 City Link (in administration, December 2014)
 Everest
 Fairline Boats (sold to Wessex Bristol in 2015)
 Jaeger (entered administration in April 2017)
In 2020, the firm delisted from the stock market after their investee companies suffered huge disruption to their businesses during the COVID-19 pandemic.

Former Investments 

Northern Aerospace Limited

References

External links
 Official website

Private equity firms of the United Kingdom